Savaleyevo (Häwäläy) is a rural locality (a village) in Akbulatovsky Selsoviet, Tatyshlinsky District, Bashkortostan, Russia. The population was 100 as of 2010. There are 3 streets.

Geography 
Savaleyevo is located 46 km southwest of Verkhniye Tatyshly (the district's administrative centre) by road. Staroakbulatovo is the nearest rural locality.

References 

Rural localities in Tatyshlinsky District